is a former Japanese football player. He won the 1999 Bangabandhu Cup with the Japan Football League XI.

Club statistics

References

External links

1977 births
Living people
Association football people from Fukuoka Prefecture
Japanese footballers
J2 League players
Japan Football League (1992–1998) players
Japan Football League players
Tokushima Vortis players
Association football midfielders